Schuey may refer to:

People

Nicknamed
People with the nickname Schuey include:

 Kelly Schumacher (born 1977), U.S.-born Canadian basketball player
 Michael Schumacher (born 1969), German Formula One world champion
 Steven Schumacher (born 1984), British midfielder soccer player

See also
 Schumacher (disambiguation)